Wigland is a civil parish in the Borough of Cheshire West and Chester and ceremonial county of Cheshire in England.  It, along with the neighbouring parishes of Agden, Chidlow, Stockton and Wychough, has a population of 182 (2011 Census). The population (for the parish by itself) recorded in the 2001 Census was 104.

See also

Listed buildings in Wigland

References

External links

Villages in Cheshire
Civil parishes in Cheshire